A penumbral lunar eclipse took place on Wednesday, February 9, 1944.

Visibility

Related lunar eclipses

See also 
List of lunar eclipses and List of 21st-century lunar eclipses

External links 
 Saros series 142
 

1944-02
1944 in science